Ray Bateman Jr. (August 9, 1955 – February 1, 1990) was an American luger. He competed at the 1980 Winter Olympics and the 1984 Winter Olympics. He died at the age of 34, after collapsing playing a game of squash.

References

External links
 

1955 births
1990 deaths
American male lugers
Olympic lugers of the United States
Lugers at the 1980 Winter Olympics
Lugers at the 1984 Winter Olympics
Sportspeople from Somerville, New Jersey
Sports deaths in New Jersey